The Hadith of Position is a widely-reported saying attributed to the Islamic prophet Muhammad which equates the standing of his cousin Ali to him with the standing of Aaron to Moses, with the exception that Ali is not a prophet. In Shia Islam, this hadith signifies Ali's usurped right to succeed Muhammad. In Sunni Islam, the Hadith of Position primarily supports the finality of Muhammad in the chain of prophets.

Hadith of Position 
Ibn Hisham ascribes to Muhammad that

A slightly different wording of this hadith appears in the canonical Sunni collection Sahih Muslim. This tradition is also found in the canonical Sunni works Sahih al-Bukhari, Sahih at-Tirmidhi, and Sunan Ibn Maja. In particular, Musnad Ibn Hanbal includes ten different traditions containing the above sentence. The hadith also exists with similar wordings in Shia sources, including the canonical Kitab al-kafi.

Context 
The Hadith of Position is associated with multiple occasions, including the two pacts of brotherhood between Muhammad and Ali, one before and one shortly after the migration to Medina. Muhammad also made this biblical analogy at Ghadir Khumm, as noted by Donaldson and Poonawala. 

Most frequently, however, the Hadith of Position is linked to the Expedition of Tabuk in 9-10/630-631 against the Byzantine Empire. Muhammad is said to have left Ali in charge at Medina before leaving on his longest expedition. Afterwards, rumors began to spread by the hypocrites (s), saying that Ali was left behind because he was a burden to Muhammad, according to the Sunni Ibn Hisham. Upon hearing this, the account continues, Ali left Medina and caught up (possibly in al-Jurf) with Muhammad, who reassured him, "Are you not content, Ali, to stand to me as Aaron stood to Moses, except that there will be no prophet after me?" 

The Shia al-Mufid includes a more detailed response in his famous Kitab al-irshad.

Most accounts of the expedition hold that Ali was the one left in charge of Medina, including those found in Sahihs by al-Bukhari, Muslim, and al-Tirmidhi. Some Sunni authors place others in charge of Medina: Al-Halabi names three candidates, while Ibn Kathir and Mughulta'i name two. In particular, Ibn Kathir includes an account that Ali was left only in charge of Muhammad's family and not Medina, though he also acknowledges the opposite view of the Sahihs.

Related to this biblical analogy, Muhammad is said to have named the two sons of Ali and Fatima as Hasan and Husayn after the two sons of Aaron, namely, Shabbar and Shabbir. Hyder writes that this connection is well-known today in South Asia, and in Persian and Urdu literature, according to Abbas.

Status of Aaron 
The Quran and the rabbinic literature are replete with references to the special status of Aaron and his progeny, writes Miskinzoda. In verses 20:29-32 of the Quran, Moses asks God to include his brother Aaron in his prophetic mission. His prayer is answered by God, as evidenced by verses 20:36-42, 25:35, and 28:35. Aaron thus becomes the chosen associate of Moses in his prophetic mission and in revelation, as described in verses 21:48-9 and 2:248. In Hebrew Bible, Aaron also performs miracles and is entrusted with the esoteric knowledge of the scripture.

Descendants of Aaron 
Of similar importance is the divine prerogatives bestowed upon Aaron's descendants, including the proclamation in the Hebrew Bible, "Behold, I give unto him [Aaron] My covenant of peace. And he shall have it, and his seed after him, even the covenant of an everlasting priesthood." 

This divine elevation of the prophets' families above others is a recurring theme in the Quran, where the families of Muhammad and the past prophets are given a prominent role. In particular, after the past prophets, God often selects the spiritual and material heirs to the prophets from their own kin.

Golden calf 
Aaron failed to prevent the Banu Israil from returning to idolatry, notes Miskinzoda. She also suggests that Aaron joined the Banu Israil in worshiping their idol, though this is rejected by Nasr et al. who write that Aaron rebuked the Banu Israil and enjoined them to worship God in verse 20:90 of the Quran. Lumbard writes that verse 20:88 identifies Samiri as responsible for this transgression.

Shia and Sufi views 
In Shia and Sufi sources, Moses represents the function of prophecy and Aaron that of sainthood, as with Muhammad and Ali, respectively. In Isma'ili Shia, Moses is counted as one of the seven "speaking" prophets who revealed God's law, whereas Aaron is one of the seven "silent" prophets who convey the hidden truths of God's revelation to a select group of believers.

Significance in Shia Islam

Succession to Muhammad 
As early as al-Kulayni, Shia authors have used the Hadith of Position to argue for the special status of Ali and his designation as the successor of Muhammad. For instance, al-Mufid writes that this hadith invested in Ali all the privileges which Aaron had received from Moses except prophethood. In particular, Ali was the deputy of Muhammad just as Aaron was the deputy of Moses, which implies that Ali was the rightful successor to Muhammad. 

Similarly, the contemporary Aslan notes the succession of the previous prophets by their kin in the Quran and invokes the analogy between Ali and Aaron. Based on these, he argues that Ali was the natural successor of Muhammad and his exclusion from the Saqifa affair after Muhammad's death in 632 was a deliberate move reflecting the Quraysh's fear that combining prophethood and caliphate in the Banu Hashim (Muhammad's clan) would have made them too powerful. A conversation to this effect between the Hashemite Ibn Abbas and the second caliph Umar is cited by Madelung and Momen.

Imamate 
A broader Shia interpretation of this hadith is that its biblical analogy attaches the authority of Ali and his descendants to the authority of Muhammad, implying that the political and spiritual leadership of the Shia Imams is the natural continuation of Muhammad's prophetic authority. In connection with this hadith, Mavani notes the Shia belief that the Imams have inherited the prophet's esoteric knowledge and his functions, excluding only direct revelation. In particular, the divinely-inspired Imams are the interpreters par excellence of the inner dimension of the Quran, and these two "weights" are said to never separate in the prophetic Hadith al-Thaqalayn.

Significance in Sunni Islam 
Al-Shahrastani argues that the descendants of Muhammad have special knowledge of the Quran, just as the descendants of Aaron posses a special version of the Torah. In his commentary of Sahih Muslim, al-Nawawi acknowledges the Shia implications of this hadith. So do al-Halabi in his al-Sira and the contemporary Siddiqi in his edition of Sahih al-Muslim. Despite its Shia coloring, the Hadith of Position nevertheless remains prominent in Sunni sources as one of the most important pieces of evidence supporting the finality of Muhammad in the chain of prophets.

Debates 
In response to the Shia claims, Sunni scholars argue that the Hadith of Position is irrelevant to Muhammad's succession because Aaron died before Moses. The Shia Sharif al-Murtaza counters that had Aaron survived Moses, the former would have surely succeeded the latter. The Shia al-Kulayni adds that Moses' successor Joshua later designated the progeny of Aaron to succeed him instead of his own or Moses'. Al-Kulayni suggests that Joshua did so because it was the divine choice.

The Sunni Siddiqi refutes the Shia interpretation of the Hadith of Position, saying that it refers to the family relationship between Muhammad and Ali rather than the caliphate. He argues, "Aaron was the cousin of Moses and so was the case with Ali and the Holy Prophet (may peace be upon him)." Alternatively, Miskinzoda notes that the Quran frequently refers to Aaron as a brother of Moses in verses 7:142, 19:53, and 28:25. In Jewish tradition, Exodus 6:20 similarly holds that Jochebed bore Amran (Imran) his sons Aaron and Moses.  

That Aaron was Moses' brother whereas Ali was Muhammad's cousin is a limitation of this biblical analogy for Miskinzoda. She suggests that the two pacts of brotherhood between Muhammad and Ali partially addressed this limitation by emphasizing the closeness of the two men.

See also

References

Sources

External links
 The Hadith of the Analogy "You Are to Me Like Aaron to Moses"
 The Hadith of ‘Manzila’
 Peshawar Nights (Fifth Session, Tuesday night, 27th Rajab 1345 A.H.)

Hadith
Ali
Shia Islam
Sunni Islam